Gustav Pope (1831–1910) was a British painter of Austrian origin. Active in the Victorian era, he incorporated several styles on his work, but in his mature style he showed influences of the second wave of the Pre-Raphaelite Brotherhood.

Life and career

Little is known about Pope's training as a painter, but he is listed as a regular exhibitor in London from 1852 to 1895, at the British Institution, the Royal Society of British Artists and the Royal Academy. His work shows the influence of Thomas Seddon, Dante Gabriel Rossetti and Frederic, Lord Leighton. English literary sources, classical mythology, portraiture and idealized images of young women are the most typical subjects in his paintings.

Some sources shows Gustav Pope as deceased by 1895, based on the last year he was exhibiting at the Royal Academy. Nevertheless, a Cemetery register shows 1910 as the year of his death. In 1910, the painting A Rainy Day was presented to the Bristol City Museum and Art Gallery. He was a resident of Chelsea, according to the 1901 London Census.

Selected works
 The Three Daughters of King Lear (1875–76; Museo de Art de Ponce, Puerto Rico)
 Lillies (1874), sold at Auction at Christie's, London in 2009
 The Judgement of Paris (The Apple of the Discord) (1889), sold at auction at Christie's, London in 2006.
 Dante’s Inspiration, sold at auction at Christie's, London in 2014.

 Accident or Design? work later engraved for The Illustrated London Almanack

References

British male painters
19th-century British painters
1831 births
1910 deaths
Members of the Royal Society of British Artists
Pre-Raphaelite painters
19th-century British male artists